Cosmo Graham is a professor in the Faculty of Law at the University of Leicester.  He specialises in the field of law relating to the regulation of public utilities and is co-editor of the Utilities Law Review.  He also specialises in competition law and teaches constitutional law and company law.

Professor Graham was a member of the UK's Competition Commission (1999-2008). He is Co-Editor of Utilities Law Review.

External links
Staff Profile University of Leicester

British lawyers
British legal scholars
Academics of the University of Leicester
Living people
1947 births